Chursdorf is a village and a former municipality in the district Saale-Orla-Kreis, in Thuringia, Germany. Since 31 December 2013, it is part of the municipality Dittersdorf.

References 

Former municipalities in Thuringia
Grand Duchy of Saxe-Weimar-Eisenach